"Suavemente" is a song recorded and composed by Puerto Rican artist Elvis Crespo on his first solo album, Suavemente, which followed his departure from Grupo Manía. Released as the lead single, "Suavemente" reached number one on the Billboard Hot Latin Tracks on May 16, 1998, and remained atop the chart for six weeks. Crespo re-recorded it with Spanglish lyrics. The song also hit the Billboard Hot 100 as well as received a Premios Lo Nuestro award and two Latin Billboard Music Awards the following year. "Suavemente" was the tenth best-performing Latin single of 1998. The song has been covered by several artists, some of whom also charted.

Background

Elvis Crespo started his singing career as a backup vocalist for merengue singers Willie Berrios, Lenny Perez, and Toño Rosario. In 1995, he joined Puerto-Rican merengue band, Grupo Manía as lead vocalist. He composed "Linda Eh'" for the group which reached number-eight on Hot Latin Tracks in 1996.  In 1997, he left the band to pursue a solo career and recorded his first album, Suavemente, on the Sony Discos label. Crespo credited his son for the success of the song stating that his son spent the entire afternoon singing it and told his father that the song would be a hit. The Spanglish version was featured in the 1998 film, Dance with Me. Two music videos were made: the original version with various background montages, the other one a remix with Spanglish lyrics. In 2008, the song served as the intro and outro for the live album, Elvis Crespo Lives: Live at Las Vegas and the title reappeared in the title for his tenth anniversary compilation album, Suavemente... Los Éxitos.

Track listings
CD, maxi
Side A
"Suavemente" [Spanglish Dance Mix] – (4:19)
"Suavemente" [Spanglish Edit] – (4:27)
Side B
"Suavemente" [The Factory Dance Mix] – (6:40)  	
"Suavemente" [Dance Radio Edit] – (4:19)

12"
"Suavemente" [Cibola Mix] – (3:30)
"Suavemente" [Hot Head Mix] – (3:17)
"Suavemente" [Cibola Extended Club] – (5:35)
"Suavemente" [Dance Sugar Mix] – (4:19)

Chart performance
"Suavamente" debuted at number 15 on the Hot Latin Tracks in April 1998 and jumped to number six a week later. On May 16, 1998, the song peaked at number one for six consecutive weeks. The song reached number 10 on the Billboard Top Latin Songs year-end chart of 1998. It became the second merengue song to reach number-one on Hot Latin Tracks after Juan Luis Guerra's "El Costo de la Vida".

Reception
"Suavemente" received generally positive reviews from critics. Terry Jenkins of AllMusic notes it as one of the highlights of the album of "wonderfully seductive" songs. In 1999, "Suavamente" received Lo Nuestro award for "Tropical Song of the Year" and two Billboard Latin Music awards for "Tropical/Salsa Hot Latin Track of the Year" and "Latin Dance Max-Single of the Year". Crespo responded to the success by stating that "It took me by surprise, although I had many years of experience, first in the chorus and then as a singer in Grupomanía. I believe that it's a challenge because I have to take on the responsibility to be consistent in my future projects."

Scooter version

In 2005, German group Scooter covered the song on their album Mind the Gap. It was released as the fourth and final single from the album. The music video for "Suavemente" features a tropical scene, with the three band members at the time (H. P. Baxxter, Rick J. Jordan, and Jay Frog) celebrating.

Track listings
CD single and digital download
"Suavemente" (Radio Edit) – (3:35)
"Suavemente" (Extended) – (5:42)
"Suavemente" (Club Mix) – (6:48)
"Suavemente" (Original Club) – (3:30)
"Trance-Atlantic" (Club Mix) – (4:05)

12"
"Suavemente" (Extended) – (5:42)
"Suavemente" (Club Mix) – (6:48)

Chart performance

Other covers

 Brixx's version of the song features German singer Paul Cless reached number 28 the European Hot 100 Singles Chart.
 Angie Martinez's song, "Coast 2 Coast", features Wyclef Jean singing excerpts from "Suavemente". 
 It has also been sampled in the 2011 song "Suave (Kiss Me)" by Nayer featuring Pitbull and Mohombi. 
 In 2017, American rapper Travis Scott referenced "Suavemente" on the remix of Puerto Rican singer Farruko's "Krippy Kush", which also features American rapper Nicki Minaj and Puerto Rican rappers Rvssian and Bad Bunny. 
 Mexican-American rapper Snow Tha Product sampled the song's vocals and instrumental on her song of the same title.
 The refrain was used in the song "Suavemente" by Algerian singer Soolking which reached number 1 in the French charts in 2022.

See also
List of number-one Billboard Hot Latin Tracks of 1998
List of number-one Billboard Hot Tropical Songs from the 1990s

References

1998 debut singles
2005 singles
Elvis Crespo songs
Scooter (band) songs
Spanish-language songs
Sony Discos singles
1998 songs
Songs written by Elvis Crespo
Internet memes